Bayındır Dam is a dam in Ankara Province, Turkey, built between 1962 and 1965.

See also
List of dams and reservoirs in Turkey

External links
DSI

Dams in Ankara Province
Dams completed in 1965
Dams in Turkey